Yosemite National Park is a national park in the United States.
 
Yosemite may also refer to:

Places
Yosemite, New South Wales, Australia
Yosemite, Kentucky, U.S.
Yosemite Valley, a glacial valley
Yosemite Rock, a Phantom Island in the Pacific Ocean

Transportation
 USS Yosemite (1892), an auxiliary cruiser
 USS Yosemite (1894), a steamer
 USS Yosemite (CM-2), a minelayer that bore the name from 1931 to 1939
 USS Yosemite (AD-19), a destroyer tender in commission from 1944 to 1994
 Yosemite (sidewheeler), a steamboat that operated in California, Washington, and British Columbia

Arts and entertainment
 Yosemite (film), a 2015 film
 "Yosemite" (song), a 2018 song by Travis Scott featuring Gunna and Nav
 "Yosemite" (Lana Del Rey song), 2021
 The Yosemite, a 1912 book by John Muir
 Yosemite Entertainment, a division of Sierra Entertainment

Software
 OS X Yosemite, Mac OS X version 10.10
 Yosemite Server Backup, a is cross-platform backup software

See also
List of Yosemite destinations
Yosemite bowline, a knot
Yosemite Decimal System, a system for rating walks, hikes, and climbs
Yosemite Lakes, California
Yosemite Mountain Sugar Pine Railroad
Yosemite Sam, a cartoon character
Yosemite Valley, California, a census area
Yosemite Village, California